Ko Htwe (1929 – 19 July 1947) was a Burmese security officer who was killed in the assassination of Burmese pre-independence government leaders on 19 July 1947. He was a bodyguard of U Razak, the Minister for Ministry of Education and National Planning. Ko Htwe was the lone non-office holder who was killed. Seven cabinet ministers (including Prime Minister Aung San) and a deputy minister were killed in their meeting room at the Secretariat compound in downtown Yangon. 19 July is commemorated each year as the Martyrs' Day in Myanmar.

Htwe was only 18 at his death. He was born to Ko Ko Lay, an officer at the Department of Agriculture and his wife Min Yi in Mandalay.

References

Assassinated Burmese people
1929 births
1947 deaths
People from Mandalay
Deaths by firearm in Myanmar